Colbeck Bay is a cove between Duke of York Island and Cape Klovstad in the southern part of Robertson Bay, Victoria Land, Antarctica. The geographical feature was first charted by the British Antarctic Expedition 1898–1900, under C.E. Borchgrevink, who named it for Lieutenant William Colbeck, Royal Naval Reserve, magnetic observer of the expedition. The bay lies situated on the Pennell Coast, a portion of Antarctica lying between Cape Williams and Cape Adare.

References
 

Bays of Victoria Land
Pennell Coast